Hard Lodging is a historic home located at Union Bridge, Carroll County, Maryland, United States. It is built on a small cliff overlooking the site where its first owner, Solomon Shepherd, had a mill that is no longer standing. The house was built in three stages: the middle section, a -story brick structure, was probably built first; the main section of the house is attached to the west and is a Federal-style, three-by-two-bay, -story house with an interior gable-end chimney.  Hard Lodging is currently a private residence and is no longer owned by the Historical Society. The home is an example of Pennsylvania German architecture.

Hard Lodging was listed on the National Register of Historic Places in 1978.

References

External links
, including photo from 2006, at Maryland Historical Trust

Houses on the National Register of Historic Places in Maryland
Houses in Carroll County, Maryland
Houses completed in 1790
Federal architecture in Maryland
Pennsylvania Dutch culture in Maryland
Union Bridge, Maryland
National Register of Historic Places in Carroll County, Maryland